KSID may refer to:

 KSID (AM), a radio station (1340 AM) licensed to Sidney, Nebraska, United States
 KSID-FM, a radio station (98.7 FM) licensed to Sidney, Nebraska, United States
 Kerala State Institute of Design(KSID), a state institute for designing in Kollam city, India